2002 Satkhira bombing was a double bomb attack on 28 September 2002 of Roxy cinema hall and a circus tent in Satkhira District, Bangladesh that killed 3 people and injured 100 others.

Attacks
Jamaat-ul-Mujahideen Bangladesh, a Bangladeshi Islamist terrorist organization, carried out attacks on the early 2000s in public places in Bangladesh. 

A bomb was placed in a Roxy cinema hall and another inside a circus tent in Satkhira District on 28 September 2002. Three people died in the explosion and 100 others were injured. The first bomb went off in the cinema hall and minutes later the bomb in the circus went off. Time bombs were used in the attacks. Similar attacks took place in Mymensingh in the Mymensingh cinema bombings.

References

2002 in film
2002 murders in Bangladesh
Explosions in 2002
Attacks on buildings and structures in Bangladesh
Attacks on cinemas
Islamic terrorism in Bangladesh
Islamic terrorist incidents in 2002
bombings
September 2002 crimes
September 2002 events in Bangladesh
Suicide bombings in Bangladesh
Terrorist incidents in Bangladesh in 2002
Terrorism in Bangladesh
Building bombings in Bangladesh